NGC 4650A is a polar-ring lenticular galaxy located in the constellation Centaurus. It should not be confused with the spiral galaxy NGC 4650, which shares almost the same radial distance as NGC 4650A. The real distance between both galaxies is
only about 6 times the optical radius of NGC 4650.

References

External links
 
 Hubble Heritage site: Pictures and description

Centaurus (constellation)
4650A
42951
Polar-ring galaxies
Lenticular galaxies